Melanotaenia australis, the western rainbowfish, is a species of freshwater rainbowfish endemic to Australia's Kimberley and Pilbara, Top End.

References

External links
Melanotaenia australis

australis
Freshwater fish of Australia
Fish described in 1878
Taxa named by François-Louis Laporte, comte de Castelnau